This is a list of the squads which participated at the 2001 FINA Men's World Water Polo Championship.

Hungary 

 1. Kósz
 2. Székely
 3. Varga
 4. Varga
 5. Kásás
 6. Vári
 7. Kiss
 8. Benedek
 9. Fodor
 10. Szécsi
 11. Steinmetz
 12. Molnár
 13. Biros
 Head coach: Kemény

Italy 

 1. Tempesti
 2. Postiglione
 3. Binchi
 4. Buonocore
 5. Rath
 6. R. Calcaterra
 7. Mistrangelo
 8. Angelini
 9. Felugo
 10. A. Calcaterra
 11. Di Costanzo
 12. Silipo
 13. Violetti
 Head coach: Campagna

Yugoslavia 

 1. Šoštar
 2. Trbojević
 3. Šefik
 4. Zimonjić
 5. Savić
 6. Ikodinović
 7. Jelenić
 8. Uskoković
 9. Ćirić
 10. Šapić
 11. Vujasinović
 12. Vukanić
 13. Peković
 Head coach: Manojlović

FINA